Rao Bahadur Sardar Veerabhadrappa Gunappa Desai was an Indian philanthropist, ruler of Chachadi princely state who had made significant contributions in social, religious, political, administrative, educational and literary fields. He was the 15 th Jagirdar of the Desai family. He was also a founder member of Karnatak Lingayat Education Society which was established on 11 October 1916.

Early life
He was born on August 30, 1882. He faced many problems in his childhood because of which he could not get a proper education. He was the early ruler of a  Desai's wade situated in Chachadi village of Saundatti taluk, Belagavi district. The wade was having an ownership over 33 villages. Even though he was not properly educated, he successfully ruled his province.

Notable works
He established a primary school exclusively for girls in 1904, in order to encourage the education among girls. He also established an agricultural training school for the rural youths.

Recognition
His great grandson Nagaraj Desai has set up the foundation named Sardar V G Desai Foundation Chachadi to promote Desai’s contributions.

Awards and honours
He was awarded with the titles Rao Bahadur and Sardar from the British government for his social work.

References

1882 births
Year of death missing